Shwe Hmone Yati (born 16 May 1998) is a Burmese actress. She is best known for her leading roles in several Burmese films.

Early life
Shwe Hmone Yati was born on May 16, 1998 in Yangon, Myanmar to parents; Sein Thaung and Maw Maw Khine. She has a younger sister, named Ngwe Hmone Yati. She attended at BEHS 2 Kamayut.

Career
Her career started from learning in Model Institute and Acting School. In 2012, at the age of 14, she starred her debut film Tha Khin Ye Kyay Kyun alongside Lu Min. In the same year, she starred her second film Aetta A Sate alongside Nay Toe and Palae Win and she became popular among the audiences from Myanmar. And then she acted in many film with different actors.

In 2017, she starred in Big screen Cho Myain Thaw Let Sar Chay Chin alongside Sai Sai Kham Leng and Khin Wint Wah.
In the same year, she starred in Big screen Wit Nyin Ka Kyoe alongside Aung Ye Lin and Thinzar Wint Kyaw. In 2018, she starred in Big screen movie Mhaw Kyauk Sar alongside Myint Myat. In 2019, she starred in Big screen movie Guest alongside Shwe Htoo and Nay Chi Oo. In 2020, she starred in Big screen movie Mite Mae Chit alongside Myint Myat and Khin Wint Wah.

Brand ambassadorship
She has been working as brand ambassador of Clear Myanmar since January 1, 2018. She has also been working as brand ambassador of Huawei Mobile Myanmar since May 1, 2019.

Filmography

Film (Cinema)

Aung Myin, Kyaw Kyar, Sue Sha, Htet Myet (2016)
A Chit Sit (2016)
Anubis (2016)
Cho Myain Thaw Let Sar Chay Chin (2017)
Wit Nyin Ka Kyoe (2017)
Boon Daw Kyet Thu Kho (2017)
Mar Yar Style (2017)
Mhaw Kyauk Sar (2018)
He He Ha Ha (2018)
Nge Kyun (2019)
Pyone Shwin Yay Pyaw Yae Lar (2019)
The Milk Ogre (2019)
Guest (2019)
Thit Sar Nan Taw (2019)Kye Kye Kyal Kyal (2019)Mite Mae Chit (2020)Rose Castle (2020)Kan'' (2020)

Personal life
She is married to Shwe Htoo in 2018.

References

External links

1998 births
Living people
Burmese film actresses
People from Yangon
21st-century Burmese actresses